"Valley of Tears" is a song written by Fats Domino and Dave Bartholomew and performed by Fats Domino.  It reached #2 on the U.S. R&B chart, #8 on the U.S. pop chart, and #25 on the UK Singles Chart in 1957.  It was featured on his 1957 album This is Fats.

The single's B-side, "It's You I Love", reached #6 on the U.S. pop chart in 1957.

Other charting versions
Buddy Holly released a version of the song which reached #12 on the U.K. pop chart in 1961 as the B-side of Baby I Don't Care.

Other versions
Mickey Gilley released a version of the song as the B-side to his 1961 single "I Need Your Love".
Mary Small released a version of the song as a single in 1961, but it did not chart.
Brook Benton released a version of the song on his 1962 album Singing the Blues.
Brenda Lee released a version of the song on her 1962 album Brenda, That's All.
The Upsetters released a version of the song as a single in 1963, but it did not chart.
Sam McCue with The Classics released a version of the song as the B-side to their 1964 single "What to Do (To Forget You)".
The Dixies released a version of the song as the B-side to their 1965 single "Love Made a Fool".
Slim Whitman released a version of the song on his 1967 compilation album 15th Anniversary Album.  It was produced by Scott Turner and arranged by Larry Butler.
Warren Storm released a version of the song as a single in 1984, but it did not chart.
David Box released a version of the song on his 2002 compilation album The David Box Story (David Box and The Ravens).
Soweto Gospel Choir featuring Robert Plant released a version of the song on the 2007 album Goin' Home: A Tribute to Fats Domino.
Van Morrison released a version of the song on his 2008 re-release of his album Back on Top.

References

1957 songs
1957 singles
1961 singles
1963 singles
1984 singles
Songs written by Fats Domino
Songs written by Dave Bartholomew
Fats Domino songs
Buddy Holly songs
Mickey Gilley songs
Brook Benton songs
Brenda Lee songs
Slim Whitman songs
Van Morrison songs
Robert Plant songs
Imperial Records singles
Coral Records singles
Capitol Records singles